Neoclaviceps is a fungal genus of fungi in the family Clavicipitaceae. This is a monotypic genus, containing the single species Neoclaviceps monostipa.

Species
One particular species, Neoclaviceps monostipa, infects individual florets in the same way as species of genus Claviceps but does not produce sclerotia. When grown in pure culture it shows dimorphism in production of a yeast-like ephelidial phase as well as a mycelial phase.

References

Clavicipitaceae
Monotypic Sordariomycetes genera